The Dravlje District, or simply Dravlje, is a district of the City Municipality of Ljubljana, the capital of Slovenia. It is named after the former village of Dravlje.

Geography
The Dravlje District is bounded on the south by a line running north of Grič to the outskirts of Stranska Vas; on the west by a line to Toško Čelo; on the north by a line arching down between Dolnice and Pržan and then following Pečnik Street (Pečnikova ulica), Jože Jama Street (Ulica Jožeta Jama), Stegne Street, and Waterworks Street (Vodovodna cesta); and on the east by the A2 Freeway and H2 Expressway. The district includes the former villages of Dolnice, Dravlje, Glinica (Glince), Kamna Gorica, Podutik and Zapuže.

References

External links

Dravlje District on Geopedia
Dravlje District homepage

 
Districts of Ljubljana